Yanshino is a rural locality (a village) in Krasnoplamenskoye Rural Settlement, Alexandrovsky District, Vladimir Oblast, Russia. The population was 4 as of 2010. There is 1 street.

Geography 
Yanshino is located 61 km northwest of Alexandrov (the district's administrative centre) by road. Gorki is the nearest rural locality.

References 

Rural localities in Alexandrovsky District, Vladimir Oblast